Abacetus acutangulus is a species of ground beetle in the subfamily Pterostichinae. It was described by Tschitscherine in 1903 and is an endemic species of Madagascar.

References

acutangulus
Beetles described in 1903
Insects of Southern Africa